Melakaveri is a village in the Kumbakonam of Thanjavur district, Tamil Nadu, India.it is also called "MCY"

Demographics 

As per the 2001 census, Melakaveri had a total population of 12,000 with 5864 males and 6136 females.

melakaveri is one of the major villages of kumbakonam taluk, Thanjavur dist., Tamil Nadu, India with a population of about 10000. It is situated on the highway between Thanjavur and chennai Majority of its residents are Muslims, while Hindus. Jamiya Nagar and its surroundings are hamlet of Melakaveri.

It is predominantly agriculture-based. A sizable population of people took up jobs in Far East Asia. As opportunities in these countries diminished, the educated younger generation opted for lucrative jobs in Arab countries of the Persian Gulf. Nowadays, every household in the village has at least one person in the Persian Gulf.

The level of education in the village is comparatively high in spite of absence of a high school as late as a decade ago. In order to fill the gap, we opted for an English-medium school in 1984, which recently blossomed into a higher secondary school, named Mydeen Matric. Higher Secondary School an elementary school for girls, and a government aided elementary school. ARR matriculation school BOVPAT Nursery play School,

Government Hospital is situated in New Road (PUTHU ROAD).

Temples 
Jamiya masjid Melacauvery, masjid street.

Askar masjid, jamiya nagar.
Thoweed Jaamath Masjid Kilai 1, North street.

Thoweed Jaamath Masjid Kilai 2, KMS street.

Mokkai amman temple, 3road pillayar temple

Airports 
The nearest airports are:

 Tiruchirappalli International Airport (92 kilometres or 57 miles)
 chennai International Airport (259 kilometres or 160 miles)
 Madurai Airport (228 kilometres or 141 miles)

References 

 

Villages in Thanjavur district